Unione Sportiva Castelnuovo Garfagnana are an Italian association football club, based in Castelnuovo di Garfagnana, Tuscany. The club was founded in 1922.

Formerly a professional club who last played in Serie C2/B in the 2007–08 season, they are currently playing in the amateur Eccellenza regional league.

The team's colors are dark blue and yellow.

History
First founded in 1922, Castelnuovo played Serie C2 from 1999–2000 to 2007–2008, after winning promotion from Serie D in 1998–1999. In 1999–2000, Castelnuovo gained a surprising third place, and qualified for the promotional playoffs, losing 2–1 (on aggregate) in the semifinal round to Prato.  In 2002–2003, with a fourth place in the final table, Castelnuovo again qualified for the promotion playoffs, but again lost in the semifinal round; 5–2 on aggregate to Gubbio.

The 2007–08 season saw Castelnuovo finish in 15th place, forcing it to play in the relegation playouts against Rovigo, where it won after a 3–3 aggregate score (higher classified teams are considered the winners on aggregate ties).  Although it escaped relegation to Serie D, the club was liquidated on 30 June 2008 due to financial troubles, and restarted from the Eccellenza league.

References

External links
 Official site 

Football clubs in Tuscany
Association football clubs established in 1922
Serie C clubs
1922 establishments in Italy